Helson is a surname. Notable people with the surname include:

Harry Helson (1898–1977), American psychologist 
Henry Helson (1927–2010), American mathematician
Ravenna Helson (born 1925), American psychologist, wife of Henry

See also
Gelson
Henson (name)